Holy Rollerz Christian Car Club (HRC3) is a nonprofit Christian ministry started by Brian Wood and Gustavo "Gus" Torres in Kennesaw, Georgia.  Since its beginning in 1999, it has grown to be the largest Christian automotive ministry of any kind in the world, with chapters across the United States and members across the world.

Mission statement
"The Corporation is organized for charitable, educational and recreational
purposes. The goal is to spread the Word of God throughout the community and to
provide a positive environment for automotive enthusiasts."

Membership
Membership to Holy Rollerz is through a lengthy application process.  Once completed, the application is sent to the officers of the club, who include the presidents of each chapter, for review and discussion.  The organization's trademark, a vinyl applique for the windshield of a member's vehicle, is then given to the new member.

Chapters

Domestic chapters
Atlanta, GA
Southern California
Charleston, WV
Columbus, GA
Albuquerque, NM
Chattanooga, TN
Roswell, NM
Orlando, FL
Raleigh, NC
Beaumont, TX
Houston, TX
El Paso, TX

National chapter
For members of Holy Rollerz who do not live close to a local chapter, there is a National Chapter that they can belong to.

International chapter
For international members, they belong to the International Chapter.

Internet forum
The Holy Rollerz Forum is the largest Christian automotive forum on the internet.  Popular threads are their Faith-based Discussion, General Discussion, and the local threads for each of the chapters.

Membership and posting ability on the Holy Rollerz Forum is separate from the car club.  A "user" may sign on to the forums to post, but may not become an official member of the club without going through the application process and submitting their application to the officers of the club for approval.

Media coverage of HRC3
Holy Rollerz Christian Car Club has been featured in many news articles, TV shows and their officers have been invited on radio shows. Some include,

News Papers
The Atlanta Journal-Constitution

TV Shows
Car Crazy on the Speed Channel
American Bible Society Presents
Family Net TV

Radio Shows
KKEI Radio

Feature-length Movies
R-Generation

References

External links
Holy Rollerz official website

Christian missions
Automobile associations in the United States